Paula Malcomson (born 1 June 1970) is a Northern Irish actress. She is sometimes credited as Paula Williams. She is known for playing Trixie in Deadwood (2004–2006), Maureen Ashby in Sons of Anarchy (2010), and as Abby Donovan in Ray Donovan (2013–2017).

Career
Malcomson starred as Trixie in the HBO series Deadwood and Colleen in ABC's Lost. She played the role of Amanda Graystone in the Battlestar Galactica spin-off series Caprica, on the Sci Fi Channel, as well as the role of Maureen Ashby on the FX Series Sons of Anarchy. She played the long-suffering Abby Donovan, wife of the title character in the Showtime series Ray Donovan.

In March 2011, Malcomson guest starred in the Fringe episode "Stowaway". She played Mrs. Everdeen in the film adaptation of The Hunger Games, mother of the main character Katniss Everdeen.

Filmography

Film

Television

References

External links
 
 Paula Malcomson profile for Deadwood

1970 births
Living people
Television actresses from Northern Ireland
Film actresses from Northern Ireland
Actresses from Belfast
21st-century actresses from Northern Ireland
20th-century actresses from Northern Ireland